A Long Way To Blow A Kiss is the debut full-length album by singer songwriter Antony Harding, ANT.

Track listing
 The Trick.
 Maybe Love Will Return.
 Any Girl Can Make Me Smile.
 History.
 When I Need You To.  
 Waste The Days Away.
 A Long Way To Blow A Kiss.
 I Always Hurt The One That I Love
 Every Drop Of Rain.
 Today As Yesterday.  
 April Rain.

About
All songs written by Antony Harding. Released on 29 April 2002 on Fortune and Glory Records of Moseley England. Mastered in September 2001 at Transfermation at London Bridge by Richard Dowling. Recorded at home in an upstairs bedroom in Bermondsey London and a downstairs kitchen in Stratford London between April 1999 and September 2001 on a Roland VS840 digital 8 track studio, then mixed to DAT. Wurlitzer and backing vocals on song 7 were recorded at Cushy Productions in Stockwell London by Suzanne Rhatigan.

Musicians
 Suzanne Rhatigan - backing vocals, Wurlitzer piano
 Antony Harding - vocals, guitars, electric piano/organ, drum machine, percussion, balalaika, ukulele-banjo, harmonica
 John Morrison - bass guitar

Reference list

2002 debut albums